Jordan McMahon (born 27 May 1983) is an Australian rules football player. McMahon, a native South Australian, was drafted from South Australian National Football League (SANFL) club Glenelg in the 2000 AFL draft as a first round selection (10th overall) by the Western Bulldogs. Playing as a running defender, McMahon had seven seasons at the Western Bulldogs, debuting in 2001 for four games. He began to establish himself in the Bulldogs defence with 15 games in 2002, including every game from Round 14–22. He was awarded an AFL Rising Star Nomination for his 25 possession game against the West Coast Eagles in round 18, 2002.

McMahon played 18 games in 2003 and established himself as an important member of the Bulldogs' defence, being assigned dangerous small forwards and providing run and rebound.

After seven seasons and 114 games for the Bulldogs McMahon was traded to Richmond for pick number 19 in the 2007 draft. Richmond coach Terry Wallace, his original coach at the Bulldogs, lured him to Richmond, keen to exploit his pace and kicking skill.

In 2008, McMahon made a solid debut for Richmond in their Round 1 clash against Carlton Football Club at the Melbourne Cricket Ground (MCG). His 22 disposals and seven marks helped Richmond get over the line by 30 points. In round 4 against Fremantle he played one of the best games of his career. McMahon was damaging as he kept finding the football across centre half back with 20 kicks and 12 handballs adding to a total of an outstanding career high of 32 disposals with a brilliant goal from outside 50. Against the odds, the Tigers crushed the Dockers at Subiaco Oval by 64 points. He played all 22 games in 2008 and had the club's most kicks, most handballs received, most rebounds from defensive 50 and came eighth in the Best and Fairest.

In 2009, he played 12 games. In round 18, he was the hero, kicking the match winning [[Kicks after the siren in Australian rules football|goal after the siren] 6for Richmond against Melbourne.

After Terry Wallace was replaced as coach by Damien Hardwick in 2010 McMahon was never selected and also suffered a leg injury. He was delisted by Richmond on 14 October 2010.

McMahon returned to Glenelg in 2011 after signing a two-year contract in December 2010.

References

External links

1983 births
Living people
Australian rules footballers from South Australia
Glenelg Football Club players
Western Bulldogs players
Richmond Football Club players
Werribee Football Club players
Australian sportspeople of Indian descent
Australian people of Irish descent
People educated at Immanuel College, Adelaide